Khmer script is an abugida (alphasyllabary) script used to write the Khmer language, the official language of Cambodia. It is also used to write Pali in the Buddhist liturgy of Cambodia and Thailand.

Khmer is written from left to right. Words within the same sentence or phrase are generally run together with no spaces between them. Consonant clusters within a word are "stacked", with the second (and occasionally third) consonant being written in reduced form under the main consonant. Originally there were 35 consonant characters, but modern Khmer uses only 33. Each character represents a consonant sound together with an inherent vowel, either â or ô; in many cases, in the absence of another vowel mark, the inherent vowel is to be pronounced after the consonant.

There are some independent vowel characters, but vowel sounds are more commonly represented as dependent vowels, additional marks accompanying a consonant character, and indicating what vowel sound is to be pronounced after that consonant (or consonant cluster). Most dependent vowels have two different pronunciations, depending in most cases on the inherent vowel of the consonant to which they are added. There are also a number of diacritics used to indicate further modifications in pronunciation. The script also includes its own numerals and punctuation marks.

Origin

The Khmer script was adapted from the Pallava script, used in southern India and South East Asia during the 5th and 6th centuries AD, which ultimately descended from the Tamil-Brahmi script,. The oldest dated inscription in Khmer was found at Angkor Borei District in Takéo Province south of Phnom Penh and dates from 611. Stelae of the Pre-Angkorean and Angkorean periods, featuring the Khmer script, have been found throughout the former Khmer Empire, from the Mekong Delta to what is now southern Laos, Northeast Thailand, and Central Thailand.

The modern Khmer script differs somewhat from precedent forms seen on the inscriptions of the ruins of Angkor. The Thai and Lao scripts are descendants of an older cursive form of the Khmer script, through the Sukhothai script.

Consonants 
There are 35 Khmer consonant symbols, although modern Khmer only uses 33, two having become obsolete. Each consonant has an inherent vowel: â  or ô ; equivalently, each consonant is said to belong to the a-series or o-series. A consonant's series determines the pronunciation of the dependent vowel symbols which may be attached to it, and in some positions the sound of the inherent vowel is itself pronounced. 

The two series originally represented voiceless and voiced consonants respectively (and are still referred to as such in Khmer). Sound changes during the Middle Khmer period affected vowels following voiceless consonants, and these changes were preserved even though the distinctive voicing was lost (see phonation in Khmer).

Each consonant, with one exception, also has a subscript form. Most subscript consonants resemble the corresponding consonant symbol, but in a smaller and possibly simplified form, although in a few cases there is no obvious resemblance. Most subscript consonants are written directly below other consonants, although subscript  appears to the left, while a few others have ascending elements which appear to the right. 

Subscripts are used in writing consonant clusters (consonants pronounced consecutively in a word with no vowel sound between them). Clusters in Khmer normally consist of two consonants, although occasionally in the middle of a word there will be three. The first consonant in a cluster is written using the main consonant symbol, with the second (and third, if present) attached to it in subscript form.

The consonants and their subscript forms are listed in the following table. Usual phonetic values are given using the International Phonetic Alphabet (IPA); variations are described below the table. The sound system is described in detail at Khmer phonology. The spoken name of each consonant letter is its value together with its inherent vowel. Transliterations are given using the transcription system of the Geographic Department of the Cambodian Ministry of Land Management and Urban Planning used by the Cambodian government and the UNGEGN system; for other systems see Romanization of Khmer.

The letter   appears in somewhat modified form (e.g. ) when combined with certain dependent vowels (see Ligatures).

The letter  nhô is written without the lower curve when a subscript is added. When it is subscripted to itself, the subscript is a smaller form of the entire letter:  -nhnh-.

Note that   and   have the same subscript form.

The second, third and fourth of these are rare, and occur only for etymological reasons in a few Pali and Sanskrit loanwords.

Variation in pronunciation 
The aspirated consonant letters (kh-, chh-, th-, ph-) are pronounced with aspiration only before a vowel. There is also slight aspiration with k, ch, t and p sounds before certain consonants, but this is regardless of whether they are spelt with a letter that indicates aspiration.

A Khmer word cannot end with more than one consonant sound, so subscript consonants at the end of words (which appear for etymological reasons) are not pronounced, although they may come to be pronounced when the same word begins a compound.

In some words, a single medial consonant symbol represents both the final consonant of one syllable and the initial consonant of the next.

The letter  bâ represents  only before a vowel. When final or followed by a subscript consonant, it is pronounced  (and in the case where it is followed by a subscript consonant, it is also romanized as p in the UN system). For modification to p by means of a diacritic, see Supplementary consonants. The letter, which represented /p/ in Indic scripts, also often maintains the  sound in certain words borrowed from Sanskrit and Pali.

The letters  dâ and  dô are pronounced  when final. The letter  tâ is pronounced  in initial position in a weak syllable ending with a nasal.

The letter   is silent when final (in most dialects; see Northern Khmer). The letter   when final is pronounced  (which in this position approaches ).

Supplementary consonants 
The Khmer writing system includes supplementary consonants, used in certain loanwords, particularly from French and Thai. These mostly represent sounds which do not occur in native words, or for which the native letters are restricted to one of the two vowel series. Most of them are digraphs, formed by stacking a subscript under the letter  , with an additional treisăpt diacritic if required to change the inherent vowel to ô. The character for pâ, however, is formed by placing the musĕkâtônd ("mouse teeth") diacritic over the character  .

Dependent vowels 
These can only be written in combination with a consonant (or consonant cluster). The vowel is pronounced after the consonant (or cluster), even though some of the symbols have graphical elements which appear above, below or to the left of the consonant character. 

Most of the vowel symbols have two possible pronunciations, depending on the inherent vowel of the consonant to which it is added. Their pronunciations may also be different in weak syllables, and when they are shortened (e.g. by means of a diacritic). Absence of a dependent vowel (or diacritic) often implies that a syllable-initial consonant is followed by the sound of its inherent vowel.

In determining the inherent vowel of a consonant cluster (i.e. how a following dependent vowel will be pronounced), stops and fricatives are dominant over sonorants. For any consonant cluster including a combination of these sounds, a following dependent vowel is pronounced according to the dominant consonant, regardless of its position in the cluster. When both members of a cluster are dominant, the subscript consonant determines the pronunciation of a following dependent vowel. 

A non-dominant consonant (and in some words also  hâ) will also have its inherent vowel changed by a preceding dominant consonant in the same word, even when there is a vowel between them, although some words (especially among those with more than two syllables) do not obey this rule.

The dependent vowels are listed below, in conventional form with a dotted circle as a dummy consonant symbol, and in combination with the a-series letter  ’â. The IPA values given are representative of dialects from the northwest and central plains regions, specifically from the Battambang area, upon which Standard Khmer is based. Vowel pronunciation varies widely in other dialects such as Northern Khmer, where diphthongs are leveled, and Western Khmer, in which breathy voice and modal voice phonations are still contrastive.

The spoken name of each dependent vowel consists of the word  srăk ("vowel") followed by the vowel's a-series value preceded by a glottal stop (and also followed by a glottal stop in the case of short vowels).

Modification by diacritics
The addition of some of the Khmer diacritics can modify the length and value of inherent or dependent vowels.

They are shown with the a-series consonant  ’â.

The first four configurations listed here are treated as dependent vowels in their own right, and have names constructed in the same way as for the other dependent vowels (described in the previous section).

The word  "yes" (used by women) is pronounced [caː] and rarely .

The bânták (a small vertical line written over the final consonant of a syllable) has the following effects:

However, its o-series pronunciation becomes  before final y, and  before final (silent) r.

Consonants with no dependent vowel
There are three environments where a consonant may appear without a dependent vowel. The rules governing the inherent vowel differ for all three environments. Consonants may be written with no dependent vowel as an initial consonant of a weak syllable, an initial consonant of a strong syllable or as the final letter of a written word.

In careful speech, initial consonants without a dependent vowel in weak initial syllables are pronounced with their inherent vowel shortened as if modified by the bânták diacritic (see previous section). For example the first-series letter "" in "" ("torch") is pronounced with the short vowel . The second-series letter "" in "" ("light") is pronounced with the short diphthong .

Initial consonants in strong syllables without written vowels are pronounced with their inherent vowels. The word  ("to tie") is pronounced ,  ("weak", "to sink") is pronounced . In some words, however, the inherent vowel is pronounced in its reduced form, as if modified by a bântăk diacritic, even though the diacritic is not written (e.g.   "corpse"). Such reduction regularly takes place in words ending with a consonant with a silent subscript (such as   "every"), although in most such words it is the bânták-reduced form of the vowel a that is heard, as in   "noise". The word  "you, person" has the highly irregular pronunciation .

Consonants written as the final letter of a word usually represent a word-final sound and are pronounced without any following vowel and, in the case of stops, with no audible release as in the examples above. For example, according to rules for native Khmer words,  ("good", "clean", "beautiful") would appear to be a single syllable, but, being derived from Pali subha, it is pronounced .

Ligatures
Most consonants, including a few of the subscripts, form ligatures with the vowel  (ា) and with all other dependent vowels that contain the same cane-like symbol. Most of these ligatures are easily recognizable, but a few may not be, particularly those involving the letter  .

Some more examples of ligatured symbols follow:

Here the vowel is not a itself, but another vowel (au) which contains the cane-like stroke of that vowel as a graphical element.

    An example of the vowel a forming a connection with the serif of a consonant.

    Subscript consonants with ascending strokes above the baseline also form ligatures with the  vowel symbol.

    Another example of a subscript consonant forming a ligature, this time with the vowel .

Independent vowels
Independent vowels are non-diacritical vowel characters that stand alone (i.e. without being attached to a consonant symbol). In Khmer they are called  sră pénh tuŏ, which means "complete vowels". They are used in some words to represent certain combinations of a vowel with an initial glottal stop or liquid. The independent vowels are used in a small number of words, mostly of Indic origin, and consequently there is some inconsistency in their use and pronunciations. However, a few words in which they occur are used quite frequently; these include:    "now",    "father",    "or",    "hear",    "give, let",    "oneself, I, you",    "where".

Independent vowel letters are named similarly to the dependent vowels, with the word  sră  ("vowel") followed by the principal sound of the letter (the pronunciation or first of the pronunciations listed above), followed by an additional glottal stop after a short vowel. However the letter ឥ is called  sră ĕ .

Diacritics
The Khmer writing system contains several diacritics, used to indicate further modifications in pronunciation.

Dictionary order 

For the purpose of dictionary ordering of words, main consonants, subscript consonants and dependent vowels are all significant; and when they appear in combination, they are considered in the order in which they would be spoken (main consonant, subscript, vowel). The order of the consonants and of the dependent vowels is the order in which they appear in the above tables. A syllable written without any dependent vowel is treated as if it contained a vowel character that precedes all the visible dependent vowels.

As mentioned above, the four configurations with diacritics exemplified in the syllables  are treated as dependent vowels in their own right, and come in that order at the end of the list of dependent vowels. Other configurations with the reăhmŭkh diacritic are ordered as if that diacritic were a final consonant coming after all other consonants. Words with the bânták and sâmyoŭk sânhnhéa diacritics are ordered directly after identically spelled words without the diacritics.

Vowels precede consonants in the ordering, so a combination of main and subscript consonants comes after any instance in which the same main consonant appears unsubscripted before a vowel.

Words spelled with an independent vowel whose sound begins with a glottal stop follow after words spelled with the equivalent combination of  ’â plus dependent vowel. Words spelled with an independent vowel whose sound begins  or  follow after all words beginning with the consonants  rô and  lô respectively.

Words spelled with a consonant modified by a diacritic follow words spelled with the same consonant and dependent vowel symbol but without the diacritic.

Numerals 

The numerals of the Khmer script, similar to that used by other civilizations in Southeast Asia, are also derived from the southern Indian script. Western-style Arabic numerals are also used, but to a lesser extent.

In large numbers, groups of three digits are delimited with Western-style periods. The decimal point is represented by a comma. The Cambodian currency, the riel, is abbreviated using the symbol  or simply the letter  rô.

Spacing and punctuation 

Spaces are not used between all words in written Khmer. Spaces are used within sentences in roughly the same places as commas might be in English, although they may also serve to set off certain items such as numbers and proper names.

Western-style punctuation marks are quite commonly used in modern Khmer writing, including French-style guillemets for quotation marks. However, traditional Khmer punctuation marks are also used; some of these are described in the following table.

A hyphen ( sâhâ sânhnhéa) is commonly used between components of personal names, and also as in English when a word is divided between lines of text. It can also be used between numbers to denote ranges or dates. Particular uses of Western-style periods include grouping of digits in large numbers (see Numerals hereinbefore) and denotation of abbreviations.

Styles 
Several styles of Khmer writing are used for varying purposes.

 refers to oblique letters. Entire bodies of text such as novels and other publications may be produced in âksâr chriĕng. Unlike in written English, oblique lettering does not represent any grammatical differences such as emphasis or quotation. Handwritten Khmer is often written in the oblique style.
 or  refers to upright or 'standing' letters, as opposed to oblique letters. Most modern Khmer typefaces are designed in this manner instead of being oblique, as text can be italicized by way of word processor commands and other computer applications to represent the oblique manner of âksâr chriĕng.
, also known as the Khom Thai script, is a style used in Pali palm-leaf manuscripts. It is characterized by sharper serifs and angles and retainment of some antique characteristics, notably in the consonant kâ. This style is also for yantra tattoos and yantras on cloth, paper, or engravings on brass plates in Cambodia as well as in Thailand.
 is calligraphical style similar to âksâr khâm as it also retains some characters reminiscent of antique Khmer script. Its name in Khmer means literally 'round script' and it refers to the bold and thick lettering style. It is used for titles and headings in Cambodian documents, on books, banknotes, shop signs and banners. It is sometimes used to emphasize royal names or other important names.

Unicode 

The basic Khmer block was added to the Unicode Standard in version 3.0, released in September 1999. It then contained 103 defined code points; this was extended to 114 in version 4.0, released in April 2003. Version 4.0 also introduced an additional block, called Khmer Symbols, containing 32 signs used for writing lunar dates.

The Unicode block for basic Khmer characters is U+1780–U+17FF:

The first 35 characters are the consonant letters (including two obsolete). The symbols at U+17A3 and U+17A4 are deprecated (they were intended for use in Pali and Sanskrit transliteration, but are identical in appearance to the consonant , written alone or with the a vowel). These are followed by the 15 independent vowels (including one obsolete and one variant form). The code points U+17B4 and U+17B5 are invisible combining marks for inherent vowels, intended for use only in special applications. 

Next come the 16 dependent vowel signs and the 12 diacritics (excluding the kbiĕh kraôm, which is identical in form to the ŏ dependent vowel); these are represented together with a dotted circle, but should be displayed appropriately in combination with a preceding Khmer letter.

The code point U+17D2, called  , meaning "foot", is used to indicate that a following consonant is to be written in subscript form. It is not normally visibly rendered as a character. U+17D3 was originally intended for use in writing lunar dates, but its use is now discouraged (see the Khmer Symbols block hereafter). The next seven characters are the punctuation marks listed hereinbefore; these are followed by the riel currency symbol, a rare sign corresponding to the Sanskrit avagraha, and a mostly obsolete version of the vĭréam diacritic. The U+17Ex series contains the Khmer numerals, and the U+17Fx series contains variants of the numerals used in divination lore.

The block with additional lunar date symbols is U+19E0–U+19FF:

The symbols at U+19E0 and U+19F0 represent the first and second "eighth month" in a lunar year containing a leap-month (see Khmer calendar). The remaining symbols in this block denote the days of a lunar month: those in the U+19Ex series for waxing days, and those in the U+19Fx series for waning days.

See also 
 Khmer Braille
 Romanization of Khmer
 Khom Thai script

Notes

References 
 Dictionnaire Cambodgien, Vol I & II, 1967, L'institut Bouddhique (Khmer Language)
 Jacob, Judith. 1974. A Concise Cambodian-English Dictionary. London, Oxford University Press.

External links 
Omniglot entry on Khmer
Khmer Romanization Table (PDF)

 
Khmer language
Writing systems of Asia
Writing systems without word boundaries